SXDF-NB1006-2 is a distant galaxy located in the Cetus constellation, with a spectroscopic redshift of z = 7.213 or 12.91 billion light-years away. It was discovered by the Subaru XMM-Newton Deep Survey Field. The galaxy was claimed to be the most distant galaxy at announcement in June 2012, as the more distant claimants were not confirmed spectroscopically at the time. It exceeded the previous confirmed distance holder, GN-108036, also discovered by the Subaru. Oxygen emission lines have been detected in its spectrum.

See also
List of the most distant astronomical objects
z8 GND 5296

References

Galaxies
Cetus (constellation)